Panara may refer to:
 Panara, Madhya Pradesh, a census town in India
 Panará people, an ethnic group of Brazil
 Panará language, a language of Brazil
 Panara (butterfly), a genus of butterflies
 Panara (Lithuania), a village in Varėna district municipality, Alytus County, Lithuania

 family name
 Robert Panara (1920–2014), American deaf studies pioneer
 Roberta Panara (born 1986), Italian swimmer

See also 
 Panera
 Pannaria, a genus of fungi

Language and nationality disambiguation pages